The Buddha: The Story of Siddhartha is a 2010 PBS documentary film directed by David Grubin and narrated by Richard Gere. It follows the story of Gautama Buddha's life and discusses the history and teachings of Buddhism. The film was nominated for the Primetime Emmy Award for Outstanding Writing for a Nonfiction Programming.

See also
Depictions of Gautama Buddha in film

References

External links
 

2010 documentary films
2010 films
2010 television films
American documentary television films
Biographical documentary films
Documentary films about Buddhism
Documentary films about Gautama Buddha
Films directed by David Grubin
2010s American films